The Swedish Figure Skating Championships are a figure skating national championship held annually to determine the national champions of Sweden.

Senior medalists

Men

Ladies

Pairs

Ice dancing

Junior medalists

Men

Ladies

Pairs

Ice dancing

References

Sources
 "Der Eissport", 35th year, No.8, 8 March 1926

External links
 Skate Sweden 

 
Figure skating national championships
Figure skating in Sweden
Figure